The registration group or identifier group is the second element in a 13-digit ISBN (first element in a 10-digit ISBN) and indicates the country, geographic region, or language area where a book was published. The element ranges from one to five numerical digits.

In 2007, the length of an ISBN changed from 10 to 13 digits, and a new 3-digit prefix (978 or 979) was added in front of 10-digit ISBNs. The following registration groups are compatible with or without a 978- prefix:

 0–5, 7
 600–649
 80–94
 950–989
 9900–9989
 99900–99999

The following must have a 979- prefix:

 979-8
 979-10 through 979-12
(979-0 is reserved for International Standard Music Numbers for sheet music)

Shorter registration group numbers are generally used for countries or regions with greater publishing volume. Because a longer number leaves room for fewer publishers and ISBNs, several countries have more than one number assigned. On the other hand, some countries (Australia, Switzerland, Fiji) have no unique number because they fall in a broader geographic region or language area.

With 10-digit ISBN or 978- prefix

Prefixes of length 1

Prefixes of length 2

Prefixes of length 3

Prefixes of length 4

Prefixes of length 5

Distribution

Countries with no exclusive registration group 

Australia, Austria, Belgium, Bermuda, Canada, Eswatini, Germany, Gibraltar, Ireland, New Zealand, South Africa, Switzerland, United Kingdom, Zimbabwe

Countries with multiple registration groups 

 Two (51 countries)
 Andorra, Bahrain, Benin, Bhutan, Bosnia and Herzegovina, Botswana, Brazil, Bulgaria, Colombia, Cyprus, Dominican Republic, Ecuador, English, Ethiopia, Faroe Islands, Finland, Ghana, Greece, Haiti, Honduras, Hong Kong, Hungary, Iceland, India, Jordan, Kazakhstan, Kenya, Latvia, Lebanon, Luxembourg, Malawi, Montenegro, Myanmar, Namibia, Netherlands, Nicaragua, North Macedonia, Oman, Pakistan, Peru, Philippines, Portugal, Qatar, Saudi Arabia, Singapore, Sri Lanka, Sudan, Tunisia, Uganda, Ukraine, Uruguay

 Three (23 countries)
 Argentina, Armenia, Cambodia, Costa Rica, El Salvador, Estonia, Georgia, Guatemala, Indonesia, Iran, Kuwait, Lithuania, Macau, Malaysia, Mexico, Morocco, Nepal, Republika Srpska, Romania, Taiwan, Tajikistan, Tanzania, Thailand

 Four (7 countries)
 Albania, Algeria, Bolivia, Malta, Mauritius, Paraguay, Turkey

 Five (1 country)
 Mongolia

Countries by language area

Countries in broader registration groups 

 5 former  USSR (14)

 80 former  (2)
 , 

 86 former  (7)

 976  (5)

 982 South Pacific (14)

ISBN vs UN 

 UN countries not part of ISBN (38)

 ISBN agencies not part of the UN (10)

With 979- prefix

See also
International Standard Book Number
International Standard Serial Number
List of group-0 ISBN publisher codes
List of group-1 ISBN publisher codes

Notes

References

External links
International ISBN Agency - Ranges

International Standard Book Number
Number-related lists
Publishing